was a Japanese singer and tarento. She was born in Kōriyama, Fukushima Prefecture. She graduated from Shōshi Kōtō High School. She was nicknamed . She was represented with Happy Strike.  She had a brain tumor found in her second year of elementary school and she had surgery to remove it. After that, by the time she made her debut, she had one operation in the second year of junior high school and two operations in the third year of high school; during her hospitalization for her surgery, she was influenced by the appearance of idols she saw on television, and she claimed that she wanted to be like they too, so she decided to begin a fight against the cancer to achieve her dreams. After she died, she was buried in Nichirinji Temple, Motomiya. Her sister is Miss iD 2016 finalist and Go Yoshida Award winner Yuka Maruyama.

Filmography

Magazines

Television

Radio

Internet

Discography

Singles

References

External links
 
 

Japanese idols
Musicians from Fukushima Prefecture
1993 births
2015 deaths
People from Kōriyama